Jeffrey Philip Gold, M.D. is an American surgeon, medical educator, and academic administrator who has been the chancellor of the University of Nebraska Medical Center since February 1, 2014. In May 2017, he also was named interim chancellor of the University of Nebraska at Omaha, and will serve as chancellor for both institutions concurrently.

Education
Dr. Gold received his B.S.E. degree in theoretical and applied mechanics from Cornell University in 1974, and earned his M.D. degree from Weill Cornell Medical College in 1978. He did his medical residency in general surgery at New York Presbyterian Hospital and Memorial Sloan Kettering Cancer Center from 1978 to 1983, his adult cardiothoracic surgery fellowship at the Brigham and Women’s Hospital from 1983 to 1984, and pediatric cardiac surgery fellowship Boston Children’s Hospital from 1983 to 1985, respectively.

Career
From 1985 to 1996, Dr. Gold was an attending surgeon and division chief of Congenital Cardiac Surgery at New York Presbyterian and Memorial Sloan Kettering Cancer Center, and professor in Cardiovascular and Thoracic Surgery at Weill Cornell Medical College in New York City.

From 1996 to 2005, he was professor and chairman of the Department of Cardiovascular and Thoracic Surgery at the Albert Einstein College of Medicine. He was also the director of the residency program in Thoracic Surgery and Cardiovascular and Thoracic Surgeon-in-chief at Montefiore Medical Center in the Bronx, N.Y.

From 2005 to 2014, Dr. Gold served as dean of the University of Toledo College of Medicine and Life Sciences. He served as provost and then chancellor and executive vice president of the University of Toledo Medical Center.

Dr. Gold became chancellor of the University of Nebraska Medical Center on February 1, 2014. As chief executive officer, Dr. Gold is in charge of all aspects of the medical campus, which has 3,600 students, 5,000 staff members, and an annual operating budget of more than $640 million, as well as the clinical enterprise with 6,500 employees and an operating budget of more than $1 billion.  Three years later, on May 8, 2018, Dr. Gold was also asked by University of Nebraska President Hank M. Bounds to serve as chancellor for the University of Nebraska at Omaha, on an interim basis, following the retirement of the university’s previous chancellor, John Christensen. The new responsibilities did not include any increase in salary.

Achievements, awards, and honors
Dr. Gold has authored 40 books and chapters, over 200 peer-reviewed articles, 250 national presentations. He is a nationally recognized leader for transforming academic medical education, serving on over 50 professional committees and over 100 national organizations. He has won numerous awards, among them, Medical Mission Hall of Fame's "Lifetime Achievement Award" awarded annually for exemplary dedication and achievement in medical missions (2010), the American Heart Association's "Legacy of Life" Award for exemplary leadership and dedication to improving the lives of others (2009) and he is a fellow of the American College of Surgeons, and a member of the New York Academy of Medicine.

Also, he has been consistently named "The Best Doctors in New York" by New York Magazine, "The Best Doctors In America" by American Health Magazine, "Best Doctors in America" by Better Living Magazine, and "Best Doctors In America" by Castle Connelly.

The Jeffrey P. Gold, M.D. Scholarship for Excellence and Professionalism at the University of Toledo College of Medicine was named after him. The "Jeffrey P. Gold, M.D. Distinguished Professorship in Cardiothoracic Surgery" was established in his honor in 1995 by The Raymond & Beverly Sacker Foundation as an Endowed Professorship in cardiothoracic surgery at Weill Cornell Medical College.

References

Living people
Cornell University College of Engineering alumni
Cornell University faculty
Albert Einstein College of Medicine faculty
University of Toledo faculty
University of Nebraska Medical Center faculty
Heads of universities and colleges in the United States
Weill Cornell Medical College alumni
American health care chief executives
Year of birth missing (living people)
American Jews